Monica Chinnakotla is an Indian actress who has appeared in Tamil films. After making her debut in the Tamil film Jeeva (2014), she has been seen in films including Jiivi (2019) and Bachelor (2021).

Career
Monica made her acting debut in a supporting role as Sri Divya's sister in Suseenthiran's cricket drama Jeeva (2014), before first playing the lead female character in  Pagadi Aattam (2017). She continued to associate with Suseenthiran, by hosting the press event of Nenjil Thunivirundhal (2017) and then appearing in a pivotal role in Genius (2018).

In 2019, she starred in Jiivi and Thozhar Venkatesan, directed by Suseethiran's assistant Mahashivan, with both films winning her acclaim.

Filmography
Films

Television

References

External links 
 

Indian film actresses
Tamil actresses
Living people
Actresses in Tamil cinema
21st-century Indian actresses
Year of birth missing (living people)